San Donato Tavarnelle s.r.l. is an Italian association football club, based in San Donato in Poggio and Tavarnelle Val di Pesa, Tuscany. They first gained promotion to the Serie C in 2022, having won the 2021–22 Serie D Group E title.

History

Foundation 

The club was founded in 2006 after the merger of San Donato and Libertas Tavarnelle as Associazione Sportiva Dilettantistica San Donato Tavarnelle.

Serie D 
In the season 2013–14 the team was promoted for the first time, from Eccellenza Tuscany/B to Serie D.

After a number of seasons in the top amateur league of Italy, the 2021–22 Serie D season saw San Donato Tavarnelle winning the Group E title, thus ensuring the small Tuscanian club a historical first promotion to professional football.

Current squad

Out on loan

References

External links 
 Official homepage

Football clubs in Tuscany
Serie C clubs
Serie D clubs
Association football clubs established in 2006
2006 establishments in Italy
Barberino Tavarnelle